Margunn Bjørnholt (born 9 October 1958 in Bø, Telemark) is a Norwegian sociologist and economist. She is a research professor at the Norwegian Centre for Violence and Traumatic Stress Studies (NKVTS) and a professor of sociology at the University of Bergen.

Her research focuses on gender-based violence, migrants and refugees, gender equality, men and masculinities, policy studies, and several other topics. Her most recent research explores questions of gender, violence and power, including sexual and gender-based violence against women migrants and refugees and violence in indigenous Sámi communities. Her earlier research focused on ethical banking, money, monetary systems, management and organisational change in the public sector.

She has also worked as a consultant, a civil servant, served as an expert to the European Commission and been president of the Norwegian Association for Women's Rights.

Background and career

She studied economics, regional planning, politics and contemporary history; she holds a cand.mag. degree from the University of Tromsø (1981), an MA in European economic studies from the College of Europe (1982), a mag.art. (PhD) in economic sociology from the University of Oslo (1995), with a dissertation on microfinance, ethical and interest-free banking, and a PhD in the field of men's studies from Örebro University (2014), with the dissertation Modern Men. The dissertation, influenced and advised by psychologist Margot Bengtsson, employs social psychological and sociological perspectives on intergenerational transmission and social change. She was awarded full professor competence in 2015.

In the 1980s and early 1990s she worked at the Regional Development Fund, the National Institute of Technology, and as a partner in a consultancy, promoting regional development and women's entrepreneurship and leadership. From 1993 she was affiliated with the Project for an Alternative Future, a research program at what is now the Centre for Development and the Environment at the University of Oslo. Since 1997 she has worked as a researcher and professor at a number of research institutions including the Work Research Institute, the University of Oslo and the University of Bergen. In 2016 she became a Research Professor at the Norwegian Centre for Violence and Traumatic Stress Studies (NKVTS) at the University of Oslo. In 2021 she also became a professor of sociology at the University of Bergen.

She has served as an independent expert on gender equality to the European Commission, and has been a visiting scholar at the Feminism and Legal Theory Project (led by Martha Albertson Fineman) at Emory Law, the GEXcel Center of Gender Excellence and the Centre for Law and Social Justice at the University of Leeds. She was a member of Anne Hellum's research group Rights, Individuals, Culture and Society at the University of Oslo Faculty of Law and is a member of the expert committee of Rethinking Economics in Norway. She is a global affiliate of Fineman's research group, the Vulnerability and the Human Condition Initiative at Emory Law, and of the WiSE Centre for Economic Justice at the Glasgow School for Business and Society. She has taught students in sociology and psychology at the University of Oslo, and students in peace and conflict studies, governance, criminology, health policy and family therapy at other universities.

Research
Her research interests include gender-based violence, migration, gender equality, men and masculinities, organisation, policy studies and several other topics. She has published papers in The Sociological Review, the Journal of European Social Policy, Qualitative Research, Retfærd, the Nordic Journal of Criminology, the Journal of Gender-Based Violence, Norma, Fathering, Central and Eastern European Migration Review, and other journals.

Her research in the 1990s focused on ethical banking, money and monetary systems. From the late 1990s she focused on management and organisational change in the public sector, particularly organisational and spatial flexibility. Her research on working life led her to work–family issues and men's studies, and from the 2000s she has published widely on changes over time and generations in men's work–family practices and gender relations, employing social psychological and sociological perspectives on intergenerational transmission and social change. She has also studied the cultural adaptations and transnational practices of Polish migrants to Norway, and has been involved in several projects in Central and Eastern Europe.

Since the 2010s her research has focused on questions of gender, violence and power. She has led several research projects at NKVTS funded by the Ministry of Justice and Public Security, including a project on intimate partner violence with a focus on the importance of gender and power relations and a project on violence in indigenous Sámi communities. She currently heads the Norwegian part of an EU-funded research project on sexual and gender-based violence against women migrants and refugees, in cooperation with Jane Freedman, Ruth Halperin-Kaddari and researchers in six other countries in Europe, the Middle East and Canada. The aim of the project is to make policy recommendations for reducing women's vulnerability to sexual and gender-based violence. She co-edited a book on Men, Masculinities and Intimate Partner Violence with Lucas Gottzén and Floretta Boonzaier, and a book on violence in close relations with Kristin Skjørten and others.

Other research fields include theories of social justice, the welfare state, human rights, and feminist economics. She has cooperated with the American legal theorist Martha Albertson Fineman for a number of years and edited an issue of the journal Retfærd on Fineman's vulnerability theory in 2013. She was co-editor, with the Scottish economist Ailsa McKay, of the 2014 book Counting on Marilyn Waring: New Advances in Feminist Economics. She has also published works on the contemporary use of intangible cultural heritage, the relationship between learning and architecture, and research methods.

Civic and political activities

In the early 1980s she was a journalist for the feminist radio station radiOrakel. She was involved in the ethical banking movement in the early 1990s as chair of a working group attempting to start a bank in Norway modelled after, and in cooperation with, JAK Members Bank in Sweden. She has been president of the Norwegian Association for Women's Rights (2013–2016), President of the Norwegian Women's Lobby (2014–2016) and a board member of the International Alliance of Women (2013–2017). She was appointed by the Norwegian government as a member of the Norwegian delegation to the 59th and 60th sessions of the UN Commission on the Status of Women (CSW). She was a candidate for the Green Party in the 2015 elections.

Honours
Article of the Year – Scandinavian University Press Academic Journal Prize (2021).

References

External links

1958 births
Living people
Norwegian sociologists
Norwegian economists
Social psychologists
Economic sociologists
Family sociologists
Sociologists of law
Men and masculinities scholars
Feminist economists
Norwegian feminists
Norwegian civil servants
Academic staff of the University of Oslo
Academic staff of the University of Bergen
Norwegian Centre for Violence and Traumatic Stress Studies people
Work Research Institute people
Innovation Norway people
College of Europe alumni
University of Tromsø alumni
University of Oslo alumni
Norwegian expatriates in Belgium
Norwegian women academics
Norwegian women sociologists
HuffPost writers and columnists
Norwegian women's rights activists
People from Bø, Telemark
People from Bærum
20th-century Norwegian politicians
21st-century Norwegian politicians
20th-century Norwegian women politicians
21st-century Norwegian women politicians